Ticho is the second album by the pop singer Ewa Farna, released on 1 October 2007. It was very successful in the Czech Republic, gaining platinum status within two months of release, with over 25 thousand copies sold.

"Jaky to je" from the album was the theme song of the Czech soap opera Oskliva katka. Like other albums by Farna, Ticho has a Polish version called Cicho. The song "Ponorka" for example, has a Polish version called "Ogien we mnie".

The album's first single was "Ticho" which reached the top 5 on the T-Music chart. It was written by Kirsten Eg Bruun, Fabian Petersen, Mats Lundgren and Max Lachmann. The original title was "Fractions".

Tracks

External links
 [ Ticho] at Allmusic

Ewa Farna albums
2007 albums